Traffic control is a branch of logistics.

Traffic control or traffic controller or traffic management or traffic manager may also refer to:

Road traffic control, directing vehicles and pedestrians around a construction zone etc 
Traffic guard or traffic controller, a person who directs road traffic through a temporary traffic control zone
Traffic lights or traffic control signals, signalling devices control flows of road traffic
Traffic light control and coordination
Bandwidth management, measurement and control of communications traffic
Network traffic control, in computer networking
Air traffic management, systems that assist aircraft to depart and land and transit airspace
Air traffic control, a service provided by ground-based air traffic controllers to aircraft
Train dispatcher or rail traffic controller, a person directing the movement of trains 
Sea traffic management, systems that assist ships and ports for tracking maritime traffic
"Traffic Control", a 2019 song by Giriboy
 tc (Linux), a Linux utility for network traffic control

See also

Traffic (disambiguation)
Active traffic management